Ninad Rathva (born 10 March 1999) is an Indian cricketer. He made his first-class debut for Baroda in the 2017–18 Ranji Trophy on 17 November 2017, where he scored a century in the first innings. He made his Twenty20 debut for Baroda in the 2017–18 Syed Mushtaq Ali Trophy on 21 January 2018. He made his List A debut for Baroda in the 2017–18 Vijay Hazare Trophy on 14 February 2018.

References

External links
 

1999 births
Living people
Indian cricketers
Place of birth missing (living people)
Baroda cricketers